Jessica Cérival (born 20 January 1982 in Quimper, Finistère) is a French track and field athlete who specialises in the shot put.

She attended her first major competition in 2007, the 2007 European Athletics Indoor Championships, and she finished seventh overall. She took part in the following edition in 2009 but was knocked out in the qualifying round.

In spite of this, 2009 turned out to be a significant progression for the athlete. She became the French national champion and went on to take the shot put gold at the 2009 Mediterranean Games, becoming the first French women in thirty years to take the title. She was selected for the French team at the 2009 World Championships in Athletics and she finished eleventh.

She closed the year with a silver medal behind Anca Heltne at the 2009 Jeux de la Francophonie. She came fourth at the 2011 European Athletics Indoor Championships and was the silver medallist at the 2011 European Cup Winter Throwing outdoors. She represented France at the 2012 IAAF World Indoor Championships, but did not progress beyond the qualifiers.

Competition record

References

External links
Photos from Mediterranean Games  from Life

1982 births
Living people
French female shot putters
Mediterranean Games gold medalists for France
Athletes (track and field) at the 2009 Mediterranean Games
Mediterranean Games medalists in athletics
Competitors at the 2007 Summer Universiade
Sportspeople from Quimper